Aldhils Arboretum is the fifth full-length album by the indie rock band Of Montreal. It was intended to be a departure from their previous concept albums, The Gay Parade and Coquelicot Asleep in the Poppies: A Variety of Whimsical Verse. Instead of a unified theme, this album is a "singles" album of sorts, with each song being its own story alone.

Track listing
All songs written by Kevin Barnes. 
 "Doing Nothing" – 3:23
 "Old People in the Cemetery" – 3:20
 "Isn't It Nice?" – 2:55
 "Jennifer Louise" – 2:00
 "The Blank Husband Epidemic" – 2:39
 "Pancakes for One" – 2:41
 "We Are Destroying the Song" – 2:47
 "An Ode to the Nocturnal Muse" – 3:43
 "Predictably Sulking Sara" – 2:27
 "Natalie and Effie in the Park" – 2:12
 "A Question for Emily Foreman" – 2:42
 "Kissing in the Grass" – 3:39
 "Kid Without Claws" – 3:56
 "Death Dance of Omipapas and Sons for You" – 2:23

References

Of Montreal albums
2002 albums
Kindercore Records albums